MSU Faculty of Biology  is a faculty of Moscow State University, created in 1930. There are about 1500 employees, including over 100 professors, 140 associate professors and teachers, 700 research associates. The Faculty Dean is - Mikhail Kirpichnikov, a member of the Russian Academy of Sciences.

Departments
There are 27 departments and more than 50 scientific laboratories, 5 special laboratories, 2 biostations, zoological museum, herbarium and botanical garden with its branch:

Department of Anthropology
Department of Biochemistry
Department of Bioengineering
Department of Biological evolution
Department of Bioorganic chemistry
Department of Biophysics
Department of Biotechnology
Department of Cell biology and histology
Department of Embryology
Department of Entomology
Department of General ecology
Department of Genetics
Department of Geobotany
Department of Higher nervous activity
Department of Highest plants
Department of Human and animals physiology
Department of Hydrobiology
Department of Ichthyology
Department of Immunology
Department of Microbiology
Department of Molecular biology
Department of Mycology and algology
Department of Physical and chemical biology
Department of Physiology of plants
Department of Virology
Department of Zoology of invertebrates
Department of Zoology of vertebrata

Biological stations and other branches
Belomorsky biological station of N. A. Pertsov
The Moscow State University Zvenigorod biological station of S. N. Skadovsky
Zoological Museum of Moscow University
Botanical garden
Aptekarsky ogorod - botanical gardens branch
Herbarium

External links

References 

Biology, Faculty of
Education in Moscow